Meltzer's triad describes the classical symptoms suggesting the diagnosis of cryoglobulinaemia of polyclonal CGs seen in essential-, viral-, or connective tissue disease-associated cryoglobulinaemia. The triad consists of:
 palpable purpura
 arthralgia (joint pain)
 weakness.

References 

Symptoms and signs: Vascular
Medical triads